Gnoma longicollis is a species of beetle in the family Cerambycidae. It was described by Johan Christian Fabricius in 1787 originally under the genus Cerambyx. It is known from Malaysia, Borneo, Singapore, India and Sumatra.

References

Lamiini
Beetles described in 1787